The white-eyed starling (Aplonis brunneicapillus) is a species of starling in the family Sturnidae. It is found in the Solomon Islands archipelago. Its natural habitats are subtropical or tropical moist lowland forests and subtropical or tropical swamps. It is threatened by habitat loss.

References

External links
BirdLife Species Factsheet

white-eyed starling
Birds of Bougainville Island
Birds of the Solomon Islands
white-eyed starling
Taxonomy articles created by Polbot